The A13 motorway is a motorway in the Netherlands, connecting the cities of The Hague and Rotterdam. The Rotterdam The Hague Airport is located next to the A13.

Route description
The , highly congested motorway is the main motorway connection between these two cities. It is a dual carriageway with three lanes in each direction. Between the junctions Berkel and Delft-Zuid managed motorway is effective, when certain intensities occur the hard shoulder is opened for traffic heading north. The maximum speed on the road is 100 km/h.

European route E19, the route between Amsterdam and Paris, follows the complete A13 motorway between the interchanges Ypenburg and Kleinpolderplein.

Future
To relieve the southern part of A13 motorway from traffic, the plan exists for a major by-pass for the city of Rotterdam, connecting the A13 directly with the A16 motorway. The A16 will be extended from its current terminus at interchange Terbregseplein towards a new interchange with the A13 between exits Berkel en Rodenrijs and Delft-Zuid. The remaining part of the A13, between this interchange and interchange Ypenburg, would then have to be widened.

Exit list

References

External links

Motorways in the Netherlands
Motorways in South Holland
Transport in Rotterdam
Transport in The Hague
Delft
Lansingerland
Rijswijk